Croatian singer-songwriter Vesna Pisarović has released eight studio albums, one extended play (EP), two compilation albums and 30 singles. 

Pisarović's debut studio album Da znaš was released in 2000 and spawned two singles, "Ja čekam noć" and "Da znaš". Her second studio album titled Za tebe stvorena was released in 2001. The album is certified gold in Croatia. Her second studio album spawned five singles "Za tebe stvorena (Tvoja voljena)", "Da je meni (oko moje)", "Ti si samo jedan", "Jutro donosi kraj" and "Da sutra umrem". Kao da je vrijeme... is Pisarović's third studio album and her last to be released through Croatia Records. The record spawned four singles and was certified gold in Croatia. 

Pisarović's fourth and fifth album, Pjesma mi je sve and Peti, were released through Hit Records. Pjesma mi je sve is certified silver in Croatia. Peti was Pisarović's last pop record. From 2012 to 2019, Pisarović released three jazz records - With Suspicious Minds, Naša velika pjesmarica and Petit Standard.

Albums

Studio albums

Compilation albums

Extended plays

Singles

As lead artist

As featured artist

Videography

Music videos

Notes

References

Discographies of Croatian artists
Pop music discographies